I Will Teach You To Be Rich is a 2009 personal finance book by Ramit Sethi who writes a blog of the same name. The book, published by Workman became a New York Times Bestseller.

Reviews

References

Business books
Self-help books
2009 non-fiction books